Chamika Bandara Madushani (born 13 November 1980) is a former Sri Lankan female cricketer. She has represented Sri Lanka in 2 T20Is and in a single ODI match.

References

External links 
 Profile at PCB

1980 births
Living people
Sri Lankan women cricketers
People from Anuradhapura
Sri Lanka women Twenty20 International cricketers
Sri Lanka women One Day International cricketers